Eutane is a genus of moths in the subfamily Arctiinae. The genus was erected by Francis Walker in 1854.

Species
Eutane alba Hampson, 1900 (Borneo)
Eutane nivea Hampson, 1905 (Borneo)
Eutane terminalis Walker, 1854 (Australia)
Eutane trimochla Turner, 1940 (Australia)
Eutane triplagata Pagenstecher, 1900 (Papua New Guinea)

References

External links

Lithosiini
Moth genera